Pembrey Sands Air Weapons Range is a Ministry of Defence air weapons range located near the village of Pembrey, Carmarthenshire,  northwest of Burry Port and  south of Carmarthen, Wales. Adjacent to the weapons range site was a Royal Air Force station known as RAF Pembrey which closed is 1957 and is now a in civilian use as Pembrey Airport.

History

RAF Pembrey

Origin 
Construction of the airfield for RAF Training Command started in 1937. The airfield opened in March 1939, and by September 1939 the RAF's No. 2 Air Armament School was the first unit to be stationed at the airfield.

Second World War 
By May 1940, the three tarmac runways were completed and the airfield transferred initially to 11 Group RAF Fighter Command and then to the newly formed 10 Group RAF Fighter Command. Supermarine Spitfire pilots of 92 Squadron used Pembrey as their base from 18 June 1940, including Squadron Leader Stanford Tuck, until 12 August, Geoffrey Wellum the author of the 2002 memoir, "First Light", and Tony Bartley. During the Battle of Britain, 92 Squadron pilots who were to be at readiness at dawn spent the night in a tent set up near the aircraft.

From January to March 1941, 256 Squadron operated from Pembrey. In early 1941, No. 316 Polish Fighter Squadron was formed at Pembrey, inflicted losses on enemy aircraft, and moved on to RAF Colerne in June.

Between 1941 and 1945 Pembrey was host to the RAF's No. 1 Air Gunners School, involving Bristol Blenheim and Vickers Wellington bombers and Spitfire fighter aircraft, and included experimental courses. From 1943 to 1945 Wing Commander George Peter Macdonald was Commanding Officer, No. 1 Air Gunners School, and Station Commander of RAF Pembrey.

Fortunate gain of an enemy aircraft 
In June 1942, a Focke-Wulf Fw 190 landed here in error after a dog fight over the Bristol Channel. Oberleutnant Armin Faber, adjutant of III fighter Gruppe of JG2, had been engaged by Spitfires of 19 Squadron and the Czech Wing over south Devon, England on 23 June. Being forced north beyond Exeter, Faber mistook the Bristol Channel for the English Channel. Short on fuel, he landed at Pembrey, believing it to be a Luftwaffe airfield in the Cotentin Peninsula, Normandy, France. The Pembrey Duty Pilot grabbed a Very pistol, ran from the control tower, and jumped onto the wing of Faber's aircraft as it taxied. Faber was taken to RAF Fairwood Common by Group Captain David Atcherley for interrogation.

Faber was piloting the latest enemy fighter, the Focke-Wulf 190A-3, a type the RAF had only seen flying over France. The depths of Faber's despair at providing his enemy with an intact Fw 190 can be gauged by the fact that he subsequently attempted to commit suicide. As news broke of his landing in Pembrey, Fighter Command dispatched pilots to photograph and return the aircraft to the Royal Aircraft Establishment at Farnborough. The RAF finally had an Fw 190 to compare with its V.S Spitfire IX and Hawker Typhoon Ia aircraft.

Post-war 
In September 1953 a Vampire crashed at the airfield, killing the pilot, Squadron Leader Lionel Hubert Wakeford DFC. Shortly before closure, in June 1957, a Hunter I (WT563) crashed on approach to the airfield, killing Pilot Officer Frederick William Rupert Vernon Jacques when he ejected at low level; the aircraft crashed into Kidwelly railway station. Both airmen were buried in St Illtyd Churchyard, Pembrey, along with 32 wartime RAF casualties, including seven from the Polish Air Force.

In 1968 a bomb exploded at the airfield, seriously injuring a warrant officer; in the "climate of sporadic bomb threats" the BBC interviewed people in Kidwelly about whether they believed the Prince of Wales should come to Wales.

On 22 August 1997 Pembrey was officially opened as a civil airfield and named Pembrey Airport.

Pembrey Sands Air weapons range 

Pembrey is still associated as a service facility with the former RAF Pembrey Sands Air Weapons Range, now a Defence Infrastructure Organisation (DIO) establishment. The airfield is now split into a number of facilities: the Welsh Motor Sports Centre occupies most of the area, part of the land has reverted to agriculture, part contains a hangar formerly used by the Dyfed-Powys Police Air Support, whilst  of the north east portion of the former RAF Runway 04/22 was opened as Pembrey West Wales Airport in August 1997. It remains a working airfield and operates charter flights into the airport. The airfield is also home to the Llanelli Model Flying Club.

Former units

Former squadrons include:
Nos 595/5, 92, 118 (Spitfires)
Nos 32, 79, 316 – formed at Pembrey. (Hurricanes)
Nos 238, 248. (Beaufighters)
Nos 256, 307. (Boulton Paul Defiants)
No. 233 OCU (Vampires, Tempests, Mosquitos, Meteors and Hunters)

Other former units include:
 No. 1 Bombing and Gunnery School RAF
 No. 14 Operational Training Unit RAF
 No. 41 Gliding School RAF
 No. 225 Squadron RAF
 No. 2742 Squadron RAF Regiment
 No. 2875 Squadron RAF Regiment
 Air Sea Rescue Flight RAF, Pembrey/Fairwood Common (1941) became 'D' Flight, No. 276 Squadron RAF 
 Pembrey Station Flight

See also
Pembrey Circuit
Court Farm, Pembrey

References

Bibliography

 Smith, David, J. (1981). Action Stations. 3: Military airfields of Wales and the North West. Cambridge: Patrick Stephens Ltd. .

Royal Air Force stations in Wales
Royal Air Force stations of World War II in the United Kingdom
Buildings and structures in Carmarthenshire